This is a list of first horror films by country.

List

See also
 Lists of horror films

Notes

References

Lists of horror films